The Iranian Business Council - Dubai is a business council formed by Iranian expatriates in Dubai, United Arab Emirates. The council promotes trade relations between Iran and the United Arab Emirates.

See also

 Iranian Club, Dubai
 Iran–United Arab Emirates relations

References

External links
 
 

Business organisations based in the United Arab Emirates
Iranian diaspora in the United Arab Emirates
Iran–United Arab Emirates relations
Organisations based in Dubai